The White Body of Evening is a 2002 horror novel by A. L. McCann. It is set in late 19th century Melbourne where a family is facing a degenerating marriage and the children exposed to the city's possibilities.

Background
The White Body of Evening was first published in Australia in August 2002 by Flamingo in trade paperback format. In 2003 it was re-released in mass market paperback format. The White Body of Evening won the 2002 Aurealis Award for best horror novel.

References

External links
The White Body of Evening at the HarperCollins

2002 Australian novels
Australian horror novels
Novels set in Melbourne
Aurealis Award-winning works
Flamingo books